Michael Ronald Tomlak (born October 17, 1964 in Thunder Bay, Ontario) is a former professional ice hockey centre who played four seasons for the Hartford Whalers of the National Hockey League.

Tomlak was drafted 208th overall by the Toronto Maple Leafs in the 1983 NHL Entry Draft. He played 141 career NHL games, scoring 15 goals and 22 assists for 37 points.

Career statistics

External links

1965 births
Living people
Canadian ice hockey centres
Cornwall Royals (OHL) players
HDD Olimpija Ljubljana players
Hartford Whalers players
Ice hockey people from Ontario
Sportspeople from Thunder Bay
Milwaukee Admirals (IHL) players
Springfield Indians players
Toronto Maple Leafs draft picks
Canadian expatriate ice hockey players in Slovenia